Hailie Jenae Mace (born March 24, 1997) is an American professional soccer player who plays as a defender for Kansas City Current of the National Women's Soccer League. She debuted for the United States women's national soccer team in 2018.

Early life
Mace was born and raised in Ventura, California, where she attended Buena High School. She played  youth club soccer for Eagles SC in the Elite Clubs National League (ECNL).

UCLA, 2015–2018
In 2015, Mace led all Bruin freshmen in games played at 19. In 2016, she started all 22 games for UCLA and helped the team record 9 shutouts. In 2017, she was a Hermann Trophy semifinalist, First-team All-American, All-West Region and All-Pac-12. Mace led the team with four game-winning goals and once again started every game for the Bruins. UCLA advanced to the College Cup final in 2017, where they would lose 3–2 to rival Stanford.

Club career

Melbourne City
Mace was drafted by Sky Blue FC with the second overall pick in the 2019 NWSL College Draft. However, she did not sign with the team and instead joined Australian club Melbourne City FC on a guest-player contract. In her professional debut, Mace scored twelve minutes after subbing on and helped Melbourne City win 4–0 against the Newcastle Jets.

FC Rosengård
In February 2019, Mace signed with Swedish club FC Rosengård.

North Carolina Courage, 2020–2021

On January 10, 2020, Mace's NWSL rights  were traded to the North Carolina Courage in exchange for McCall Zerboni. She made her debut in the 2020 NWSL Challenge Cup against the Portland Thorns FC. Mace did have an assist to North Carolina's first goal which was scored by Debinha. The Courage ended up winning the game 2–1. Mace scored her first NWSL goal on May 28, 2021, against Racing Louisville FC in the 75' minute of play. Later in that game she scored again in the 89' minute to help North Carolina win 5–0

Kansas City NWSL, 2021–

On July 22, 2021, Mace was traded to NWSL club Kansas City NWSL with teammates Kristen Hamilton and Katelyn Rowland in exchange for Amy Rodriguez and $60,000 in allocation money. She debuted on July 23, 2021, for the club, who was playing her former team the North Carolina Courage. The game ended in a scoreless draw.

International career

Youth national teams
Mace has participated in U.S. Youth National Team camps with the under-20 and under-23 national teams.

Senior national team
In February 2018, Mace received her first call-up to the United States women's national team ahead of the 2018 SheBelieves Cup but did not play. The following month, she was called up for two friendlies against Mexico as a replacement for injured defender Casey Short. She earned her first cap on April 8 during the team's 6–2 win over Mexico. In August of the same year, she was named to the roster for two friendlies against Chile. She made her second appearance for the national team on September 1 during the team's 3–0 win over Chile.

In September 2018, Mace was named to the team's 20-player roster for the 2018 CONCACAF Women's Championship, the qualification tournament for the 2019 FIFA Women's World Cup. She was the only college player named to the squad. Mace started and played 90 minutes during the team's 5–0 shutout against Panama on October 17.

During the September 2022 FIFA international window, Mace was called up to replace the injured Kelley O'Hara during two friendlies against Nigeria. She was called up once again in October 2022 for the friendlies against the English and Spanish women's national teams.

Career statistics

International

Honors

Club
FC Rosengård
 Damallsvenskan: 2019

International
 CONCACAF Women's Championship: 2018

References

External links
 US Soccer player profile
 Melbourne City player profile 
 UCLA Bruins player profile
 
 

1997 births
Living people
People from Ventura, California
Soccer players from California
American women's soccer players
United States women's international soccer players
Women's association football defenders
UCLA Bruins women's soccer players
NJ/NY Gotham FC draft picks
Melbourne City FC (A-League Women) players
American expatriate sportspeople in Australia
Damallsvenskan players
FC Rosengård players
American expatriate women's soccer players
Expatriate women's footballers in Sweden
American expatriate sportspeople in Sweden
Expatriate women's soccer players in Australia
National Women's Soccer League players
North Carolina Courage players
Kansas City Current players